Lewis Morgan (born 30 September 1996) is a Scottish professional footballer who plays as a winger for Major League Soccer club New York Red Bulls. Morgan has previously played for Celtic, St Mirren, Sunderland, and Inter Miami CF. He made his first international appearance for Scotland in May 2018.

Club career

St Mirren
Morgan started his career in the Rangers youth system before joining St Mirren on a two-year contract in September 2013. Morgan made his debut for St Mirren on 27 September 2014 in a 2–1 home defeat to Celtic in the Scottish Premiership.

On 14 May 2015, Morgan signed a two-year extension to his contract, running until 2017. After breaking into the first team, Morgan signed a further one-year contract extension in August 2016, tying him to the club until 2018.

Celtic

2017–18
On 5 January 2018, Morgan signed a four-and-a-half year contract with Celtic and was immediately loaned back to St Mirren until the end of the season, helping the club to win the 2017–18 Scottish Championship and achieve promotion.

2018–19
He was given the number 16 jersey upon moving to Celtic. On 10 July 2018, Morgan made his Celtic debut as a substitute in a 3–0 away win over Armenian side Alashkert in the first leg of the first qualifying round of the 2018–19 UEFA Champions League competition.

Morgan was loaned to Sunderland on 31 January 2019. He scored his first Sunderland goal in an EFL Trophy semi-final win over Bristol Rovers. Morgan scored his only league goal for Sunderland on 19 April 2019 in a 2–0 home win against Doncaster Rovers.

2019–20
In the absence of the injured Odsonne Edouard, Morgan played as a striker for Celtic in several matches in late 2019, beginning with a match against Rennes in the UEFA Europa League in which he scored the opening goal of a 3–1 victory.

Inter Miami
In January 2020, Celtic accepted an offer for Morgan from the newly-established Major League Soccer club Inter Miami. Morgan accepted terms on a reported three-year deal with the club. Morgan made his debut for Inter Miami in their inaugural match, a 1–0 defeat against Los Angeles FC on 1 March. On 9 September 2020, he scored two goals in a 2–1 win over Atlanta United.

New York Red Bulls
On 12 December 2021 Inter Miami CF traded Lewis Morgan to the New York Red Bulls for $1.2 million dollars in allocation money.  On 26 February 2022, Morgan made his debut for New York, appearing as a starter in a 3–1 victory over San Jose Earthquakes in the opening match of the season. On 5 March 2022, Morgan scored a hat trick in the first half to lead New York to a 4–1 victory over Toronto FC. Morgan was named MLS Player of the Week for Week 2 of the 2022 season.  On 28 May 22, Morgan scored a spectacular goal to help lead New York to a 4–1 victory over rival D.C. United. On 22 June 2022, Morgan helped New York to advance to the semifinals of the 2022 U.S. Open Cup, scoring the opening goal of the match in a 3–0 victory over local rival New York  City FC. On 27 August 2022, Morgan opened the scoring for New York  in a 3–1 victory against his former club Inter Miami. On 31 August 2022, Morgan scored the lone goal of the match in a 1–0 victory over CF Montréal, helping New York to its record ninth road win of the season.  On November 18, 2022, Morgan was named New York Red Bulls Team MVP for the 2022 season. On 13 January 2023, Morgan penned a 3-year deal with the Red Bulls, keeping him at the club until the end of the 2025 season, with a club option for an additional year.

International career
In May 2018, Alex McLeish called Morgan into the senior Scotland squad for friendly matches against Peru and Mexico. He made his full Scotland debut on 29 May 2018, in a 2–0 defeat to Peru.

Career statistics

Club

Honours
Sunderland
 EFL Trophy runner-up: 2018–19

Celtic
 Scottish League Cup: 2019–20

References

External links

1996 births
Living people
Footballers from Paisley, Renfrewshire
Scottish footballers
Association football midfielders
Rangers F.C. players
St Mirren F.C. players
Celtic F.C. players
Sunderland A.F.C. players
Inter Miami CF players
New York Red Bulls players
Scottish Professional Football League players
English Football League players
Major League Soccer players
Scotland under-21 international footballers
Scotland international footballers
Scottish expatriate footballers
Expatriate soccer players in the United States
Scottish expatriate sportspeople in the United States